Stephen David Leahy (born 23 September 1959 in Battersea) is an English former professional footballer who played in the Football League, as a forward. He began his career at Crystal Palace where he was part of the youth team which won the FA Youth Cup in 1977. He signed professional terms in October 1976 but his first team opportunities were limited and in April 1982 after only four league appearances he moved on to Dartford.

References

1959 births
Living people
Footballers from Battersea
English footballers
Association football forwards
Crystal Palace F.C. players
Ebbsfleet United F.C. players
Dartford F.C. players
English Football League players
National League (English football) players